Mitrophrys is a genus of moths of the family Noctuidae. The genus was erected by Ferdinand Karsch in 1895.

Species
 Mitrophrys ansorgei Rothschild, 1897
 Mitrophrys barnsi Joicey & Talbot, 1921
 Mitrophrys gynandra Jordan, 1913
 Mitrophrys kenyamagaribae Stoneham, 1963
 Mitrophrys latreillii Herrich-Schäffer, [1853]
 Mitrophrys magna Walker, 1854
 Mitrophrys menete Cramer, [1775]

References

Agaristinae